Koliella is a genus of green algae in the order Prasiolales.

The genus name of Koliella is in honour of Erszébet (Elizabet) Kol (1897-1980), who was a Hungarian botanist (Mycology and Algology), who worked at the Hungarian National Museum in Budapest.

The genus was circumscribed by František Hindák in Nova Hedwigia vol.6 (issues 1/2) on page 99 in 1963.

References

External links

Trebouxiophyceae genera
Prasiolales